Yahya ibn Surur ibn Musa‘id (died ) was a sharif of the Zayd clan who served as Sharif and Emir of Mecca from 1813 to 1827.

Muhammad Ali Pasha appointed Yahya to replace his uncle Sharif Ghalib ibn Musa'id in late Dhi al-Qi'dah 1228 AH (November 1813). The imperial firman (proclamation) and khil'ah (robe of honor) were sent from Istanbul, dated Rabi al-Awwal 1229 AH (February/March 1814).

He was deposed by Muhammad Ali in Dhi al-Qi'dah 1242 AH (May/June 1827). He settled in Cairo with his family and died in 1254 AH (1838/1839).

Notes

References

1830s deaths
Year of birth missing
19th-century Arabs
Sharifs of Mecca
Dhawu Zayd